Dutch Wonderland is a  theme park just east of Lancaster, Pennsylvania in East Lampeter Township, appealing primarily to families with small children. The park's theme is a "Kingdom for Kids." The entrance to the park has a stone imitation castle façade, which was built by Earl Clark, a potato farmer, before he opened the park in 1963.

The Clark family sold Dutch Wonderland in 2001 to Hershey Entertainment and Resorts Company. They also operate Wonderland Mini-Golf (former Wonderland Cinema; demolished in 2015) and Old Mill Stream Campground at the same location, as well as the Gift Shop at Kitchen Kettle Village in nearby Intercourse, Pennsylvania. On November 12, 2010, Hershey Entertainment announced that they sold Dutch Wonderland to Palace Entertainment.

The park has 32 rides, plus a tropical-themed interactive water play area called Duke's Lagoon. The park also has an extended season, open for "Happy Hauntings" and "Dutch Winter Wonderland" events for Halloween and Christmas. The park is part of a larger area in Lancaster zoned for entertainment, dining, lodging, and conferences.

Attractions
Dutch Wonderland features 32 rides, a water park called Duke's Lagoon (named for a purple dragon costumed character), along with shows and games for children. In addition to Duke the Dragon, the park also features costumed characters Princess Brooke, Merlin the Wizard and Sir Brandon, the Knight of Safety.

A five-acre island at the back of the park, "Exploration Island", includes a Prehistoric Path featuring more than 15 animatronic dinosaurs. The island is viewable from the gondola ride.

Current roller coasters
Dutch Wonderland has three rollercoasters.

Other attractions

 Dino Dig - Part of the larger Exploration Island area.
 Prehistoric Path - Features many animatronic dinosaurs. Part of the larger Exploration Island area.

Removed rides
 Wally the Whale Boats – (1963–1967) One of the original rides for the park. It was replaced by the Swan boats. There is one of the Whales currently beside Balloon Chase.
  Swan train ride  – (1965–1967) The "Gliding Swans" was a ride that drove through the path of the park, it only lasted for three seasons until it was removed due to increased foot traffic.
 Swan Boats – (1968–1974) A swan paddle boat ride that was replaced by log boats (Now "Dragon's Lair"). One of the swans are also currently beside Balloon Chase.
  Original Iron Horse Train  – (1963–1985) In 1974 the park added a second train CP Huntington #123 which ran with the Iron Horse train. The Iron Horse train was removed after 1985 and replaced with CP Huntington #206 which was added in 1986.
  Old 99 – (1974–2002) An electric train ride that went around a track by itself made by Chance Rides. The ride was eventually replaced with a theater.
  Giant Slide – (1968–2007) Replaced with two portable slides.
  Ripcord  – (1990–2010) A parachute ride made by Venture Manufacturing, it was replaced with a Zamperla Kite Flyer.
 Ferris Windmill – (1981–2012) A kiddie Ferris wheel ride with a windmill theme, built by International amusements, the ride was removed for Exploration Island.
 Crazy Plane – (1994–2014) A Crazy Plane prototype made by Zamperla, the ride was removed after the 2014 season and was replaced by Bon Voyage Balloon Chase.
 Silo slide – (1963–2015) A slide that went down the exterior of a silo, its final year was 2015, the silo still stands today without the slide pieces.
 Lady Gay Riverboat – (1963–2016) An original ride from the park, it was modified many times since it opened, the ride and the dock were removed due to maintenance upkeep.
 Tug Boat – (1967–2016) A similar boat ride that came after the Lady Gay, the Tug Boat and Lady Gay would switch which boat was being used from time to time, until they both were ceased from operation from the park.
 Turnpike Cars 1.0 - (1963-2013) An Arrow Dynamics antique car ride that was located in the centre of the park, where Merlin's Mayhem is today. The attraction was reconstructed on Exploration Island for the 2014 season.
 Wiggle Racers – A ride where self-propelled scooters race around a track that includes a maze and a cave. This ride replaced the miniature train display which had replaced the indoor miniature circus display. The Wiggle Racers were then moved to a spot closer to the stream in the back of the park, and Huck Finn's Leapin' Frogs now reside in the footprint of the old miniature circus building.
 Astroliner – an older space simulator that was added to the park in 1978, built by Wisdom Manufacturing, removed 2020.
 VR Voyager – a modern motion simulator removed 2020.
 Space Shuttle - (1985-2021) A swinging ship ride built by Morgan. Removed in 2022.

Shows
 Bubba Bear and the Badlands Band – a Sally-produced theater show
 The Adventures of the Frog Prince – a high-dive show
 A Dragon's Tale – a high-dive show
 Storytime Corner – Princess of Dutch Wonderland and the Dutch Wonderland Knight read stories to children

Previous shows 
 Garfield the Great & Friends – A magic show based on the Garfield franchise.

See also
 Incidents at independent amusement parks

References

External links
 Official site
 Park sale to Hershey Entertainment and Resorts Company 
 Dutch Wonderland Information and Photos
 Dutch Wonderland Flickr Group
 

Amusement parks in Pennsylvania
1963 establishments in Pennsylvania
Culture of Lancaster, Pennsylvania
Buildings and structures in Lancaster County, Pennsylvania
Tourist attractions in Lancaster County, Pennsylvania
Palace Entertainment
Amusement parks opened in 1963